Short Stories of Happiness (released 2011 in Oslo, Norway, by the label Schmell! – SMLCD216) is the debut album of the Norwegian trombonist Kristoffer Kompen within his own quartet.

Critical reception 
The review by Terje Mosnes of the Norwegian newspaper Dagbladet awarded the album 5 stars (dice) With this debut album, Kompen shows stylish contemporary jazz and is one of the big surprises of Norwegian jazz. Those who have listened to this music has marked the mame Kristoffer Kompen, but then most often in connection to swing and trad jazz. Her he shows skills and creative abilities in other musical directions.

NRK Jazz critique Erling Wicklund, in his review of Kompen's album Short Stories of Happiness states:

Track listing 
All compositions by Kristoffer Kompen
"Short Story Waltz" (5:53)
"Summer Dreams" (7:37)
"Owana Dome" (3:17)
"Teiresius" (6:10)
"Love Is Funny" (4:43)
"Ballad of Happiness" (3:42)
"Jylland" (4:58)
"Roasted Duck" (6:01)
"Collembole March" (2:04)
"Kaba" (3:34)

Personnel 
Kristoffer Kompen Quartet
Kristoffer Kompen - trombone
Eirik Hegdal - saxophone
Eyolf Dale - piano
Jo Skaansar - double bass
Andreas Bye - drums

Credits 
Recorded by Vidar Lunden at Musikkloftet, March 17 and 18, 2010
Mixed by Henning Bortne at Oslo Mastering, August 30, 2010
Produced by Kristoffer Kompen
Drawn & designed by Øystein Runde

Notes 
This record is supported by: Lions club, Bøler, The Norwegian Academy of Music & Statkraft
Kristoffer Kompen is awarded this years "Young Star" Scholarship 2010!

References 

Kristoffer Kompen albums
2011 debut albums